Kara-Alma is a village in Suzak District, Jalal-Abad Region, Kyrgyzstan. Its population was 2,918 in 2021.

References
 

Populated places in Jalal-Abad Region